Bodeco is an American rock band formed in 1984 in Louisville, Kentucky by guitarist, singer and songwriter Ricky Feather and drummer Brian Burkett. It later grew into a full band, with its most famous line-up featuring Feather, Burkett, guitarist Wink O'Bannon, bassist Jimmy Brown and multi-instrumentalist Gary Stillwell. Only Feather, Brown and Stillwell remain from that version.

Titled after a portmanteau of "Bo Diddley" and zydeco, the quintet typically plays a fast-paced country- and blues-tinged rock and roll. The band has recorded four studio albums, including the November 2009 release of "Soul Boost", and a live album.

Bodeco has had a considerable impact on the Louisville music scene, finding a place at No. 80 on WFPK's "top 1000 albums of all time" and inspiring Trouser Press to dub them "[o]ne of the most underappreciated combos in the early-to-mid-'90s indie roots-rock movement".

Style
Bodeco was classified by Trouser Press as "celebratory party rawk". In 1992, The New York Times described the quintet as "a skunky country-rockabilly outfit", noting in 1993 that "[t]here's nothing quaint, cute or five-and-dime about Bodeco's brand of rockabilly. Greasy as a truck-stop burger and bumpier than a high-speed ride in the back of a pickup, this band of Louisville wild men eschews retro contrivances in favor of gristle, marrow and the occasional backwoods yowl".

Members
Ricky Feather – vocals, guitar
Jimmy Brown – bass
Gary Stillwell – percussion, keyboards
Gene Wickliffe – drums
Freddy "Southside" Wethington – guitar

Former members
Wink O'Bannon – guitar
Brian Burkett – drums
Rick Mason – guitar
Nick Reifsteck – guitar
Bill Barney - guitar
Dave Rapp - guitar

Discography

Studio albums
Bone, Hair & Hide (1992)
Callin' All Dogs (1995)
Crazy Wild (2003)
Soul Boost (2009)

Singles
High Window (1995)

Compilation contributions
Wreck Room, Vol. 3 (1996)
Sourmash (1998)

References

External links
 
 Bodeco at Trouser Press
 
  Bodeco: Smokin’ Boogie Blues at FFanzeen

Musical groups from Louisville, Kentucky
Rockabilly music groups
Homestead Records artists
1984 establishments in Kentucky
Rock music groups from Kentucky
Country musicians from Kentucky